Shortwave broadcasting in the United States allows private ownership of commercial and non-commercial shortwave stations that are not relays of existing AM/MW or FM radio stations, as are common in Africa, Europe, Asia, Oceania except Australia and Latin America. In addition to private broadcasters, the United States also has government broadcasters and relay stations for international public broadcasters.  Most privately owned shortwave stations have been religious broadcasters, either wholly owned and programmed by Roman Catholic and evangelical Protestant charities or offering brokered programming consisting primarily of religious broadcasters. To better reach other continents of the world, several stations are located in far-flung US territories. Shortwave stations in the USA are not permitted to operate exclusively for a domestic audience; they are subject to antenna and power requirements to reach an international audience.

Private shortwave broadcasting is fairly rare around the world. Critics of private broadcasting in the USA have argued that the service allows extremists to spread their message to others without fear of censorship  (despite the First Amendment guarantee of Freedom of Speech), while others argue that private shortwave broadcasters provide an important service in providing programming to people without access to other forms of uncensored media.

Non-religious private broadcasters 

While many private shortwave broadcasters in the United States are operated by religious groups or carry mostly religious programming, there have also been attempts at starting non-religious shortwave stations.

Two such stations were WRNO in New Orleans and KUSW in Salt Lake City, both of them with a rock and roll music format.  Both stations were well received by shortwave listeners, but could not make the format successful in the long run.  KUSW was eventually sold to the Trinity Broadcasting Network and converted into religious broadcaster KTBN.  WRNO kept its rock & roll format going for most of the 1980s but eventually switched formats to selling brokered airtime to political and religious broadcasts, suffered a damaged transmitter, and eventually ceased broadcasting following the death of its owner, Joe Costello. WRNO was acquired by Dr. Robert Mawire and Good News World Outreach in 2001. After installing a new transmitter, the station was within just days of returning to the air when Hurricane Katrina struck on August 29, 2005. The new transmitter was spared from flood waters, but the antenna was severely damaged by high winds. WRNO finally returned to broadcasting in 2009, operating 4 hours per day. On March 13, 2010, WRNO began transmitting a weekly religious broadcast in Arabic for a portion of its broadcast schedule.

A notable exception is WBCQ, a non-religious private station operated by Allan Weiner in Maine. WBCQ has been a success by brokering much of their airtime to fringe cults like Brother Stair and World's Last Chance, while also carrying some music and entertainment programs. WTWW primarily operated as an oldies station targeted at amateur radio and DXing audiences, along with a country music feed targeting eastern Europe; the station leased out one of its channels to LaPorte Church of Christ mainly to subsidize the other channels. WTWW went out of business November 9, 2022 and moved most of its programming to WRMI, one of the nation's largest shortwave broadcasters, with LaPorte fully taking over and relaunching WTWW a month later.

Other private shortwave stations that air a mix of religious and non-religious programs include WRMI (which also relays several International broadcast services), and WWCR.

Pirate radio 

Numerous pirate radio stations have operated sporadically in or just outside the shortwave broadcast bands.  Most are operated by hobbyists for the amusement of DX'ers with broadcasts typically only a few hours in length.

Few American pirates are political or controversial in their programming.  Pirates have tended to cluster in unofficial "pirate bands" based on the current schedules of licensed shortwave stations and the retuning of amateur radio transmitters to operate outside the "ham" radio bands.

Most pirate activity takes place on weekends or holidays, Halloween and April Fool's Day being traditional favorites of pirates. Most broadcasts are only a few minutes to a few hours at a time. One notable exception was Radio Newyork International, a short-lived attempt to establish a permanent broadcasting station operating from international waters.

Some European nations have recently begun allowing privately owned shortwave stations on a far more limited scale.

Notable personalities

Preachers/Religious broadcasters 
 Tony Alamo
 Kirby Anderson
 Mother Angelica - founder of WEWN 
 Harold Camping 
 E. C. Fulcher
 Texe Marrs
 Robert Mawire
 Dr. Gene Scott 
 Melissa Scott (replaced Dr. Gene Scott)
 Brother Stair
 Peter J. Peters

Commentators 
 Jack Anderson  – was heard on AFRTS Radio in the 1980s
 Art Bell – via a Canadian affiliate's 49-meter shortwave relay service and WFLA's 11-meter relay. Also a ham radio operator (deceased)
 Willis Conover
 William Cooper 
 Mort Crim
 Chuck Harder
 Paul Harvey  – Paul Harvey News & Commentary/Rest of the Story was carried on AFRTS Radio
 Glenn Hauser – World of Radio
 Marie Lamb – DXing With Cumbre
 Rush Limbaugh – his show was carried on WRNO-Worldwide in the 1990s
 Stan Monteith
 The Report Of The Week – YouTube Food Critic, hosts Voice of the Report of the Week
 Jay Smilkstein  –  WBCQ
 John Stadtmiller on WWCR – notorious for setting up Mark Koernke
 Hal Turner on WBCQ - The Hal Turner Radio Show
 John from Staten Island & Frank from Queens – hosting "The Right Perspective" on WWCR

Shortwave stations

Government broadcasters (USA) 

 Voice of America worldwide news service
 Radio Free Europe/Radio Liberty targeting Europe and Asia
 Radio Free Asia targeting Asia
 Radio Sawa targeting the Middle East
 Radio Farda targeting Iran
 Radio Martí targeting Cuba
 WWV/WWVH - time stations from the National Institute of Standards and Technology
 American Forces Network - focused on the military

Current privately owned US broadcasters 
 KNLS – World Christian Broadcasting – Anchor Point, Alaska
 KSDA – Adventist World Radio –  Agat, Guam
 KTWR – Trans World Radio – Agana, Guam
 KVOH – "Voice of Hope" –  Rancho Simi, California
 WBCQ – "The Planet" – Monticello, Maine
 WEWN – "Eternal Word Network" – Irondale, Alabama
 WHRI – "World Harvest Radio International" – Furman, South Carolina
 WINB – "World International Broadcasting" – Red Lion, Pennsylvania
 WJHR – Milton, Florida (unique for broadcasting in Upper Side Band modulation)
 WMLK – Assemblies of Yahweh – Bethel, Pennsylvania
 WRMI – "Radio Miami International" – Okeechobee, Florida
 WTWW – "We Transmit World Wide" – Lebanon, Tennessee
 WWCR – "Worldwide Christian Radio" – Nashville, Tennessee
 WRNO – "WRNOradio.com" – New Orleans, Louisiana

Defunct broadcasters 
 KAIJ – Dallas, Texas
 KFBS – Far East Broadcasting Company – Saipan, Northern Mariana Islands
 KGEI – San Francisco, California (studios and transmitter in Redwood City, California)
 KHBN – High Adventure Ministries Piti, Guam (now T8BZ in Palau)
 KHBI – Saipan, Northern Mariana Islands (Formerly KYOI)
 KIMF – Pinon, New Mexico (licensed, but never built)
 KJES – "The Lord's Station" – Vado, New Mexico
 KRHO – Honolulu, Hawaii
 KSAI – Saipan, Northern Mariana Islands
 KTBN – Trinity Broadcasting Network – Salt Lake City, Utah
 KUSW – "Superpower" – Salt Lake City, Utah (station sold, and became KTBN)
 KWHR – "World Harvest Radio" – Naalehu, Hawaii
 KYOI – Saipan (1982-1989) "Super Rock" commercial station, later KHBI
 NDXE – (never built)
 WCSN – Maine -Operated by the Christian Science Monitor
 WGEO - Schenectady, NY - originally owned and operated by General Electric, acquired by Voice of America during World War II
 WGTG – McCaysville, Georgia
 WHRA – "World Harvest Radio" – Greenbush, Maine
 WJIE – Evangel World Prayer Center – Louisville, Kentucky
 WNRI: Bound Brook, New Jersey owned by NBC
 WNYW – "Radio New York Worldwide" – Scituate, Massachusetts
 WSHB – Furman, South Carolina
 WYFR – Family Stations. Inc. – Okeechobee, Florida
 WWBS – Macon, Georgia
 Radio Newyork International – Pirate radio station operating from international waters
 WVOH and WTJC – Fundamental Broadcasting Network – Newport, North Carolina
 W8XK - sister station of KDKA (AM) Pittsburgh. Founded in 1920 as 8XK, later known as later known as 8XS (1921-1929), W8XK (1929-1939) and then WPIT until 1940 when it was merged with WBOS Boston, simulcasting WBZ, and then transmitting Voice of America to Europe and Africa for 12 years, before being dismantled.
 WWRB – Manchester, Tennessee (successor to WGTG and WWFV)

New stations 
 KTMI – Lebanon, Oregon – not yet on the air, construction permit

References

External links 
Official listing of active stations at the FCC.gov website. CAUTION: This FCC information is often out of date, and does not include domestic IBB relay stations.
shortwavesites – The Shortwave Transmitter Site Archive – The shortwave transmitter site archive of current and historical shortwave transmitter site information, includes data on North American shortwave broadcasters' transmitter sites both past and present
Glenn Hauser's World of Radio website
SWDXER ¨The SWDXER¨ – with general SWL information and radio antenna tips

International Broadcast Station KGEI: 1939–1994 History courtesy of FEBC International

 
Shortwave broadcasters, American
Radio in the United States